Frank Peratrovich (April 2, 1895 – January 4, 1984) was an American businessman and politician.

Early life and education 
Born in Klawock, Alaska to parents of mixed Tlingit and Serbian descent, Peratrovich served in the United States Navy during World War II. He attended the Haskell Indian Nations University in Lawrence, Kansas and the Capitol Business College in Portland, Oregon.

Career 
Peratrovich worked as an accountant in Oregon for several years. He returned to Klawock, Alaska and opened the Klawock Cash Store. Peratrovich served as mayor of Klawock as a Democrat.

In 1945–46, Peratrovich served in the Alaska Territorial House of Representatives. He then served in the Alaska Territorial Senate from 1947 to 1951 and from 1957 to 1959. Peratrovich served in the first Alaska Constitutional Convention of 1955. From 1959 to 1967, he served in the Alaska Senate. Peratrovich served in the Alaska House of Representatives from 1969 to 1973.

He received an honorary doctorate degree of Public Service from the University of Alaska Anchorage in 1973.

Personal life 
Peratrovich's brother, Roy Peratrovich, married Elizabeth Peratrovich, a Native leader who led the petition for the Anti-discrimination Act of 1945 in Alaska. He died at the Ketchikan Pioneer Home in Ketchikan, Alaska at the age of 88.

References

1895 births
1984 deaths
20th-century Native Americans
Alaska Native people
Businesspeople from Alaska
Delegates to Alaska's Constitutional Convention
Haskell Indian Nations University alumni
Mayors of places in Alaska
Members of the Alaska Territorial Legislature
Democratic Party members of the Alaska House of Representatives
Military personnel from Alaska
Native American state legislators in Alaska
Presidents of the Alaska Senate
Democratic Party Alaska state senators
Tlingit people
20th-century American politicians
20th-century American businesspeople
American people of Croatian descent